Sverdlovsky District is the name of several administrative and municipal districts in Russia. The districts are generally named after Yakov Sverdlov, a Bolshevik party leader.

Districts of the federal subjects

Sverdlovsky District, Oryol Oblast, an administrative and municipal district of Oryol Oblast

City divisions
Sverdlovsky City District, Irkutsk, a city district of Irkutsk, the administrative center of Irkutsk Oblast
Sverdlovsky City District, Krasnoyarsk, a city district of Krasnoyarsk, the administrative center of Krasnoyarsk Krai
Sverdlovsky City District, Perm, a city district of Perm, the administrative center of Perm Krai

See also
Sverdlovsky (disambiguation)
Sverdlovsk (disambiguation)
Sverdlov (disambiguation)

References